Zeranol (brand names Frideron, Ralabol, Ralgro, Ralone, Zerano; developmental code names MK-188, P-1496), or zearanol, also known as α-zearalanol or simply zearalanol, is a synthetic nonsteroidal estrogen of the resorcylic acid lactone group related to mycoestrogens found in fungi in the Fusarium genus and is used mainly as an anabolic agent in veterinary medicine.

Zeranol is approved for use as a growth promoter in livestock, including beef cattle, under the brand name Ralgro (by Merck Animal Health) in the United States. In Canada, it is approved for use in beef cattle only. Its application is not approved for use in the European Union. However, it is marketed under the brand name Ralone in Spain.

Although zeranol may increase cancer cell proliferation in already existing breast cancer, dietary exposure from the use of zeranol-containing implants in cattle is insignificant. Zeranol may be found as a contaminant in fungus-infected crops. It is 3 to 4 times more potent as an estrogen than the related compound zearalenone.

See also 
 α-Zearalenol
 β-Zearalenol
 Taleranol
 Zearalanone
 Beef hormone controversy

References 

Lactones
Mycoestrogens
Mycotoxins
Resorcinols
Veterinary drugs
World Anti-Doping Agency prohibited substances